Hurndall is a surname. Notable people with the surname include:

Frank Brereton Hurndall (1883–1968), English polo player
Richard Hurndall (1910–1984), English actor
Tom Hurndall (1981–2004), English activist

English-language surnames